Ȧ (minuscule: ȧ) is a letter of the Latin alphabet, derived from A with the addition of a dot above the letter. It is occasionally used as a phonetic symbol for a low central vowel, . As a character in a computer file, it can be represented in the Unicode character encoding, but not the standard ASCII character encoding.

References

Latin letters with diacritics
Phonetic transcription symbols